Lake Caracocha or Lake Ccaraccocha (both possibly from Quechua q'ara naked, bald, unpopulated, qucha lake) is a lake in Peru located in the Huancavelica Region, Huaytará Province, Pilpichaca District. Caracocha lies south of the lakes named Choclococha and Orcococha.

The Caracocha dam was erected in 2000. It is operated by INADE.

References 

Lakes of Peru
Lakes of Huancavelica Region
Dams in Peru
Buildings and structures in Huancavelica Region